The 1933–34 season was the 60th season of competitive football by Rangers.

Overview

Results
All results are written with Rangers' score first.

Scottish League Division One

Scottish Cup

Appearances

See also
 1933–34 in Scottish football
 1933–34 Scottish Cup

Scottish football championship-winning seasons
Rangers F.C. seasons
Rangers